Anne Chambers may refer to:

Anne Cox Chambers, media proprietor
Anne Chambers (author), Irish historian and author
Anne Coleman Chambers, American educator